The 151st Massachusetts General Court, consisting of the Massachusetts Senate and the Massachusetts House of Representatives, met in 1939 during the governorship of Leverett Saltonstall. Joseph R. Cotton served as president of the Senate and Christian Herter served as speaker of the House.

"1939 was the first year the General Court began meeting every other year instead of annually. ...No session was held in 1940 and no legislation or other materials relating thereof was published during that year."

Senators

Representatives

See also
 76th United States Congress
 List of Massachusetts General Courts

References

Further reading

External links

 
 

Political history of Massachusetts
Massachusetts legislative sessions
massachusetts
1939 in Massachusetts